The National Heroes Square is a monument and war memorial in Putrajaya, Malaysia. The memorial is located at Precinct 1 to replace the National Monument (Tugu Negara) as a venue of Warriors Day (Hari Pahlawan). The Heroes Square is laid down in a similar pattern to that of Horse Guards Parade.

History
Completed on 2016, it is the location of the celebration of Warriors Day every year in Malaysia in accordance with the ruling of the National Fatwa Council in 1998 and the latest in April 2009. Also, the new square held its first ever Trooping the Colour the same year.

Features
Main Square 
Malaysian War Memorial Pavilion (Pavilion Memorial Peringatan Perang)
Malaysian Armed Forces and Police Museum (Muzium Angkatan Tentera Malaysia dan Polis Diraja Malaysia)

See also
 List of tourist attractions in Putrajaya
 Australian War Memorial, Canberra, Australia, a similar design to the National Heroes Square, Putrajaya.

References

2014 establishments in Malaysia
Monuments and memorials in Malaysia
Squares in Putrajaya